The 2014 Perth Hills bushfire, sometimes referred to as the Parkerville fire, was a bushfire that burned from 12 January to 1 February and affected the Mundaring municipality of the Perth Hills in the Australian state of Western Australia. During a major run of the fire on the afternoon and evening of 12 January, fifty-seven houses and numerous non-residential buildings were completely destroyed, and a further six houses were damaged in the suburbs of Mount Helena, Stoneville, and Parkerville. Approximately  of uncleared land and pasture—the majority on private property—were burned during the 21-day duration of the fire. None of the residential subdivisions impacted had been formally declared as being within a bushfire prone area.

The cause of the fire was recorded as accidental by the Department of Fire and Emergency Services (DFES). A considerable quantity of property in Stoneville was destroyed following a wind change that brought fresh breezes from the south west to the fire ground, just prior to 15:00 AWST.

Background

In the Mt. Helena, Parkerville, and Stoneville suburbs of Mundaring Shire there are a mixture of large properties with stands of open woodland and pastures, and standard residential blocks with trees in a close vicinity to houses. The majority of the area eventually burned was within a broad valley sloping gently upward, west to east. The fuels were typical of a Eucalypt open forest; an over-story composed primarily of jarrah (eucalyptus marginata) and marri (corymbia calophylla), with scrub, leaf litter and patches of grass constituting the fuel load in the under-story. The estimated average fuel load was 15 tonne per hectare (t/ha), with a maximum fuel load of 20 t/ha in some areas of the fire ground.

Fire timeline

Aftermath
https://www.perthnow.com.au/news/bushfires/parkerville-pole-owner-never-warned-about-fire-risk-ng-b88914030z

See also

Bushfires in Australia
List of Australian bushfire seasons

References

2013
Australian bushfire
Australian bushfire
Bushfire
Bushfires in Western Australia
2010s in Perth, Western Australia
Perth Hills
2013 fires in Oceania
2014 fires in Oceania